Sardia is a genus of true bugs belonging to the family Delphacidae.

The species of this genus are found in Australia.

Species:

Sardia balakotiensis 
Sardia campbelli 
Sardia campusii 
Sardia gilgitennis 
Sardia gilgitensis 
Sardia rostrata 
Sardia sialkotensis 
Sardia triformis 
Sardia vindex

References

Delphacidae